Bobby Edwards (born Robert Edward Moncrief; January 18, 1926 – July 31, 2012) was an American country music singer who recorded between 1959 and 1969. At the beginning of his career he performed and recorded under the name Bobby Moncrief. Then, having completed his service in the US Navy, he started recording as Bobby Edwards.

Biography
Edwards was born in Anniston, Alabama, United States, to a preacher, George Thomas Moncrief and Ila Eva Murray Moncrief.

As Bobby Moncrief, he first recorded for Pappy Daily at 'D' Records in 1958. His first recording was called "Long Gone Daddy". In 1959, he revived Tex Ritter's 1945 hit, written by Jenny Lou Carson, "Jealous Heart"; the record was issued on the Bluebonnet label. Then Edwards went out west, working shows on his own in southern California before songwriter Terry Fell placed him on Crest Records, and helped produce and arrange "You're the Reason." Though Edwards wrote the song, his manager and financier Fred Henley and Terry Fell received writing credits.

Darrell Cotton, Gib Guilbeau, and Ernie Williams had formed a trio, Darrell, Gib & Ernie. Then, the trio released the singles "I Goof" and "Just or Unjust", which became local hits. After adding Wayne Moore, they became The Four Young Men, which Edwards then joined to become Bobby Edwards & The Four Young Men. Their first record together was the Crest Records single "You're the Reason". In 1961, the song became a nationwide U.S. hit, peaking at No. 4 on the Billboard country chart and No. 11 on the Billboard Hot 100. The tune was later covered by Joe South and Hank Locklin. Edwards then transferred to Capitol Records and released the sound-alike "What's the Reason", which peaked at No. 71 the following year. In 1963, his single "Don't Pretend" made the Billboard country chart (No. 23), being his last single to enter the country chart. In the late 1960s, he operated a small recording studio. In the early 1970s, he also recorded several gospel albums. Edwards completely retired from the music industry in 1972 and returned to Anniston to raise a family.

Edwards lived in Smyrna, Tennessee from 2000 until his death. He died on July 31, 2012, at the Middle Tennessee Medical Center in Murfreesboro. He was 86.

Singles

References

1926 births
2012 deaths
American country singer-songwriters
Crest Records artists
Columbia Records artists
People from Anniston, Alabama
People from Smyrna, Tennessee
Country musicians from Tennessee
Country musicians from Alabama
Singer-songwriters from Alabama
Singer-songwriters from Tennessee